The 2013 Spanish motorcycle Grand Prix was the third round of the 2013 MotoGP season. It was held at the Circuito de Jerez in Jerez de la Frontera on 5 May 2013.

Classification

MotoGP

Moto2

Moto3
The race was red-flagged due to an accident involving Alan Techer. The final results were taken at the end of the 15th of the scheduled 23 laps and full points were awarded.

Championship standings after the race (MotoGP)
Below are the standings for the top five riders and constructors after round three has concluded.

Riders' Championship standings

Constructors' Championship standings

 Note: Only the top five positions are included for both sets of standings.

References

Spanish motorcycle Grand Prix
Spanish
motorcycle
Spanish motorcycle Grand Prix